SV Alemannia Waldalgesheim is a German association football club from the city of Waldalgesheim, Rhineland-Palatinate. The team is part of a larger sports club that also has departments for basketball, tennis, and general fitness.



History
Like other clubs throughout the country, Waldalgesheim struggled through World War I, but survived the conflict to become C-Klasse champions on the strength of an undefeated season in 1926–27, and followed up that success with a B-Klasse title the following year. By 1930 the club were owners of their own playing field and were still part of B-Klasse competition before the outbreak of World War II. The first team side suspended operations during the war, while the youth team remained active. SV resumed play in 1946 and by 1950 was playing in the 2. Amateurliga Rheinland (IV). For nearly two decades the club remained in local level A- and B-Klasse competition.

They played in the 2. Amateurliga Rheinhessen and Bezirksliga Rheinhessen through the 70s before backsliding. A return to Bezirksliga play in 1989 was followed by a slow climb up through the Landesliga Südwest/Ost (VI) (1997–2004) into the Verbandsliga Südwest (V) before a second-place result put Waldalgesheim into the Oberliga Südwest for the 2008–09 season.

The club remained at this level for four seasons but was relegated again in 2012 after finishing 17th in the league. It made an immediate return to the Oberliga after a Verbandsliga title in 2013. A South West Cup win in 2013–14 earned the club the right to enter the first round of the 2014–15 DFB-Pokal, the German Cup, for the first time. At the same time however the club was unable to avoid relegation from the Oberliga Rheinland-Pfalz/Saar, dropping back down to the Verbandsliga again in 2014.

The club lost its first ever DFB-Pokal match 6–0 against Bayer Leverkusen on 15 August 2014.

Honours
The club's honours:

League
 Verbandsliga Südwest (VI)
 Champions: 2013
 Runners-up: 2008, 2015
 Landesliga Südwest-Ost (V)
 Champions: 2004
 Bezirksliga Rheinhessen (VI)
 Champions: 1997

Cup
 Southwestern Cup
 Winners: 2014

Recent seasons
The recent season-by-season performance of the club:

With the introduction of the Regionalligas in 1994 and the 3. Liga in 2008 as the new third tier, below the 2. Bundesliga, all leagues below dropped one tier. In 2012 the Oberliga Südwest was renamed Oberliga Rheinland-Pfalz/Saar.

Stadium
The sports field at the Waldstraße has capacity for 2000 spectators.

References

External links
 Official team site
 SV Alemannia Waldalgesheim at Weltfussball.de
 Das deutsche Fußball-Archiv historical German domestic league tables 

Football clubs in Germany
Football clubs in Rhineland-Palatinate
Association football clubs established in 1910
1910 establishments in Germany